Jorge Abel López Sánchez (born 8 December 1960) is a Mexican politician affiliated with the Institutional Revolutionary Party. As of 2014 he served as Senator of the  LIX Legislature of the Mexican Congress representing Sinaloa as replacement of José Natividad González Parás and as Deputy of the LVI Legislature. He also served as Municipal President of Mazatlán between 2008 and 2010.

References

1960 births
Living people
20th-century Mexican politicians
21st-century Mexican politicians
Members of the Senate of the Republic (Mexico)
Members of the Chamber of Deputies (Mexico)
Members of the Congress of Sinaloa
Institutional Revolutionary Party politicians
Politicians from Sinaloa
People from Mocorito
Autonomous University of Sinaloa alumni
Academic staff of the Autonomous University of Sinaloa